Soma Zsombor Novothny (born 16 June 1994) is a Hungarian professional footballer who plays as a forward for NB I club Vasas SC.

Club career

Paganese
On 2 September 2013, S.S.C. Napoli loaned Novothny out to Lega Pro Prima Divisione club Paganese Calcio 1926. According to the agreement between the two clubs, Novonthny had opportunities to play more in his new club. Napoli had the option of ending the loan.

Mantova
On 10 September 2014, Novothny debuted in the Lega Pro Prima Divisione club Mantova F.C. against Lumezzane Calcio. the match ended in a goalless draw. Novonthny was substituted in the 73rd minute.

Südtirol
On 5 January 2015, Novonthny was loaned to Lega Pro Prima Divisione club F.C. Südtirol for the second half of the 2014–15 season. His coach was going to be his former Napoli coach Adolfo Sormani.

On 6 January 2015, Novothny debuted in the F.C. Südtirol in the Lega Pro Prima Divisione against Arezzo Calcio, scoring twice in 4–3 home win.

Diósgyőr
On 19 August 2015, it was officially announced that Novothny signed for Hungarian side Diósgyőri VTK for a one-year loan deal.

Busan IPark
On 20 Match 2019, it was officially announced that Novothny was loaned to Busan IPark.

VfL Bochum
On 7 September 2020, signed for VfL Bochum until June 2022.

On 3 January 2022, "Novothny approached us with the desire to terminate his contract early to pursue a new challenge. We have complied with this request, and thank him for his commitment and wish him all the best," said VfL’s Managing Director of Sport Sebastian Schindzielorz.

Anorthosis Famagusta
On 3 January 2022, it was officially announced that Novothny signed for Anorthosis Famagusta until June 2023.

Vasas SC 
On 15 June 2022, it was announced by newly promoted Vasas SC that they had signed Novothny until June 2025 on a free transfer.

Career statistics

References

External links
Photo

1994 births
Living people
People from Veszprém
Sportspeople from Veszprém County
Hungarian footballers
Association football forwards
Hungary youth international footballers
Hungary under-21 international footballers
Veszprém LC footballers
S.S.C. Napoli players
Paganese Calcio 1926 players
Mantova 1911 players
F.C. Südtirol players
Sint-Truidense V.V. players
Diósgyőri VTK players
Újpest FC players
Busan IPark players
VfL Bochum players
Anorthosis Famagusta F.C. players
Nemzeti Bajnokság I players
Nemzeti Bajnokság II players
Serie C players
K League 2 players
Bundesliga players
2. Bundesliga players
Cypriot First Division players
Hungarian expatriate footballers
Hungarian expatriate sportspeople in Belgium
Expatriate footballers in Belgium
Hungarian expatriate sportspeople in Germany
Expatriate footballers in Germany
Hungarian expatriate sportspeople in Italy
Expatriate footballers in Italy
Hungarian expatriate sportspeople in South Korea
Expatriate footballers in South Korea
Hungarian expatriate sportspeople in Cyprus
Expatriate footballers in Cyprus